Little Milton is a village and civil parish in Oxfordshire, about  southwest of Thame and  southeast of Oxford. The parish is bounded to the west by the River Thame, to the south by Haseley Brook (a tributary of the Thame), to the north by field boundaries and to the east by an old track between Great Milton and Rofford that is now a bridleway.

The A329 road between Thame and Shillingford via Stadhampton passes through the village. In the centre of the village is the Grade II listed Milton Manor, parts of which date back to the 15th century. The Church of England parish church of Saint James is a Gothic Revival building designed by John Hayward and built in 1844. Hayward also designed the west tower, which was added in 1861.

References

Sources and further reading

Villages in Oxfordshire
Civil parishes in Oxfordshire
South Oxfordshire District